Lajos Veress de Dálnok (4 October 1889 - 29 March 1976) was a Hungarian military officer, who served as commander of the Hungarian Second Army during the Second World War.

Veress was born into a Székely noble family. He finished his studies at the Ludovica Military Academy in 1910 and served as chief of staff of the Cavalry Division between 1933 and 1935. After that he had been a military attaché to Vienna in 1935–1938. From 1938 to 1940 he served as commander of the 15th Infantry Brigade. In 1940 he was the leader of the 2nd Cavalry Brigade as major general. Soon he was promoted to lieutenant general and fought at the Don Front as commander of the First Armoured Division. Between 1942 and 1944 he served as commander of the 9th Corps. He was appointed commander of the Second Army on 1 April 1944.

Before the beginning of the surrender negotiations with the Allies Regent Miklós Horthy, who tried to step out of the war, was appointed him homo regius (the regent's deputy) if Horthy would be indisposed. As a result of his pro-German officers' betrayal the German army arrested Veress and gave to the Arrow Cross authorities; a military court sentenced him to fifteen years. He was imprisoned on 16 October 1944 in Sopronkőhida but later successfully escaped. He retired in 1946.

Veress was sentenced to death on 16 April 1947 on charges of right-wing, anti-state conspiracy by a People's Tribunal. The National Council of People's Tribunals then mitigated and changed the sentence to life imprisonment. He was released during the 1956 uprising and left the country on 3 November 1956. From 1958 he served as chairman of the World Federation of Hungarian Freedom Fighters. Veress died in London. He was buried in Berkeley Springs, West Virginia.

Works
Magyarország honvédelme a 2. világháború előtt és alatt, I-III., München, 1972.

References
 Magyar Életrajzi Lexikon
 Kis, András: A magyar közösségtől a földalatti fővezérségig, Bp., 1969.
 Borbándi, Gyula: A magyar emigráció életrajza 1945-1985, Bp., 1989

1889 births
1976 deaths
People from Sfântu Gheorghe
Hungarian soldiers
Hungarian military personnel of World War II